The first season of the woman prisoned themed television series Vis a Vis originally aired on Antena 3  in Spain. The pilot episode was broadcast on April 20, 2015. The season consisted of eleven episodes; the first five episodes aired on Mondays at 10 pm and the final six aired on Thursdays at the same timeslot.

The season was executive produced by Globomedia and was created by Álex Pina, Daniel Écija, Iván Escobar and Esther Martínez Lobato.

The season features the fictional private women's correctional prison Cruz del Sur a Madrid. The story revolves around Macarena (Maggie Civantos), who was sentenced to seven years in prison for fraud. Her life be turned upside down when she meets the inmates and prison employees, who she share her home for seven years. She then meet several characters: The inmates, Zulema (Najwa Nimri), Saray (Alba Flores), Rizos (Berta Vázquez), Soledad (María Isabel Díaz Lago), Anabel (Inma Cuevas), Tere, Antonia (Laura Baena) among others as well as the prison employees: Fabio (Roberto Enríquez), Dr. Sandoval, Miranda (Cristina Plazas), Palacios (Alberto Velasco) and Valbuena (Harlys Becerra).

The season received generally positive reviews from critics who at first compared it to Netflix's popular women's prison drama, Orange Is the New Black,  before the show's broadcast. However, after its initial episode, it was apparent that the two shows belong to different genres, with Vis a Vis more of a thrilling crime drama compared to Orange Is the New Black's Comedy Drama. The show's female cast won the Ondas Awards for Best Female Performance in Fiction, two wins and four nominations in Spanish Actors Union Awards, and four nominations at the Iris Awards, among others.

Cast and characters

Cruz Del Sur inmates 

Maggie Civantos as Macarena Ferreiro
Najwa Nimri as Zulema Zahir 
Berta Vázquez as Estefania "Rizos" Kabila 
Alba Flores as Saray Vargas de Jesús 
Inma Cuevas as Ana Belén "Anabel" Villaroch Garcés 
María Isabel Díaz Lago as Soledad "Sole" Núñez Hurtado 
 as Teresa "Tere" González Largo 
Laura Baena as Antonia Trujillo Díez

Cruz del Sur employees 

Roberto Enríquez as Fabio Martínez León 
 as Carlos Sandoval Castro
Cristina Plazas as Miranda Aguirre Senén 
 Alberto Velasco as Antonio Palacios Lloret
 Harlys Becerra as Ismael Valbuena Ugarte

Macarena's family 

Carlos Hipólito as Leopoldo Ferreiro Lobo
 as Encarna Molina 
Daniel Ortiz as Román Ferreiro Molina

Police 
 as Inspector Damián Castillo

Recurring and guest 
Belén Cuesta as Yolanda Montero
 as Hanbal "The Egyptian" Hamadi
 as María Prieto "Casper" Téllez 
Sonia Almarcha as Lidia Osborne
Irene Arcos as Carolina
Carmen Baquero as Alba Vargas de Jesús 
Paula Medina as Jacky
 as Paloma Garrido "Governor" 
Juan Blanco as Alfonso "El Piti"

Episodes

Awards and nominations

References

2015 Spanish television seasons